Antanava (formerly) is a hamlet in Kėdainiai district municipality, in Kaunas County, in central Lithuania. According to the 2011 census, the hamlet was uninhabited.

At the beginning of the 20th century there was a manor (a property of the Kočanai family).

Demography

References

Villages in Kaunas County
Kėdainiai District Municipality